1993 in Ghana details events of note that happened in Ghana in the year 1993.

Incumbents
 President: Jerry John Rawlings
 Vice President: Kow Nkensen Arkaah
 Chief Justice: Philip Edward Archer

Events

January
7th - Jerry Rawlings sworn in as President of Ghana.
7th - Inauguration of  Ghana's Fourth Republic.

February
15th - some members of the opposition New Patriotic Party (NPP) are arrested for demonstrating against the national budget.

March
6th  - 37th independence anniversary held.
22nd - first nonpartisan district level elections held in 13 districts.
22nd - 35 cabinet ministers sworn into office.

April
29th - State opening of Parliament.

May

June
4 - 4 June Revolution anniversary commemorated.

July
1st - Republic day celebrations held across the country.
17th - 12 men executed for armed robbery.
22nd - the New Patriotic Party (NPP) wins 3 major cases at the Supreme Court.

August

September
 - Voter registration starts across the country.

October

November

December
Annual Farmers' Day celebrations held in all regions of the country.

Deaths
Dasrameti 
Dblack Gh.

National holidays
 1 January: New Year's Day
 6 March: Independence Day
 1 May: Labor Day
 25 December: Christmas
 26 December: Boxing day

In addition, several other places observe local holidays, such as the foundation of their town. These are also "special days."

References